Jinzi Township is a rural township in Chengbu Miao Autonomous County, Hunan, China. It borders Wugang in the north, Xiyan Town in the east and south, and Wuyang Town of Suining County in the west.

History
In December 2013, 13 villages of Xiyan Town and Qiliping Horticultural Farm merged to form Jinzi Township.

Administrative division
As of 2015, the township is divided into 1 community: Qiliping Community and 14 villages: Santang, Baishui, Jinzijiang, Shankou, Shajing, Jiangxi, Taiping, Wutang, Fenghuang, Xinghuo, Changxing, Gaozhai and Shuiqing.

Geography
The township is located in the north of Chengbu Miao Autonomous County.

The Weixi River flows through the town south to north.

Demographics
In December 2015, the township had an estimated population of 27,885 and a population density of 404 persons per km2. Miao people is the dominant ethnic group in the township, accounting for 19,380, accounting for 69.5%. There are also 4 ethnic groups, such as Dong, Hui, Han, and Manchu. Among them, there are 8,504 Han, Dong, Hui and Man (30.5%).

Economy
The main industries in and around the township are forestry and farming.

References

Chengbu Miao Autonomous County